Valley Lines was the trading name of the Cardiff Railway Company, a train operating company owned by Prism Rail and later National Express, that ran local services around Cardiff from October 1996 until October 2001.

Services
Valley Lines operated passenger services around Cardiff and the Valleys in South Wales.

Routes operated consisted of four northern branches to Aberdare, Merthyr Tydfil, Rhymney and Treherbert, which were interworked with the shorter southerly branches to Penarth, Barry Island and Cardiff Bay. The City Line between Radyr and Coryton also formed part of the franchise, with all services calling at Cardiff Queen Street.

The operator originally undertook to introduce new services from Pontypridd to Manchester and Portsmouth, but this did not take place.

The franchise predates the introduction of services that are now generally included under the 'Valley Lines' umbrella, such as those via the Vale of Glamorgan line and to Ebbw Vale.

Rolling stock
Valley Lines inherited a fleet of Class 143s and Class 150s from British Rail. Starting in 1998, the operator changed its fleet by exchanging some of its Class 150s for Class 142s from the north of England.

Valley Lines also used Mark 2 carriages on Rhymney Line services with EWS Class 37s and Fifty Fund Class 50s among the locomotives used.

Fleet

Valley Lines' fleet was maintained at Cardiff Canton depot.

Demise
In 2000 the Strategic Rail Authority announced its intention that a single all-Wales franchise should take over the majority of rail services in Wales. Accordingly, in October 2001, various operations of the Wales & West franchise were merged with those of Valley Lines to create Wales & Borders.

References 

Defunct train operating companies
National Express companies
Railway companies established in 1996 
British companies established in 1996 
Railway companies disestablished in 2001
Rail transport in Wales
Valley Lines
1996 establishments in Wales
2001 disestablishments in Wales